Pan Am is an American period drama television series created by writer Jack Orman. Named for the iconic Pan American World Airways, the series features the aircraft pilots and stewardesses of the airline as it operated in the early 1960s at the beginning of the commercial Jet Age.

Pan Am premiered on ABC on September 25, 2011, and ended on February 19, 2012. ABC canceled the series on May 11, 2012.

In May 2012, Sony Pictures Television had conversations with Amazon about picking up the series for a second season because of its international success. It won the "Best Series" at the Rose d'Or TV awards, Europe's equivalent of the Emmys. Unable to reach a deal with Amazon, the producers officially ended the series on June 20, 2012.

Cast and characters

Main 
 Christina Ricci as Margaret "Maggie" Ryan, the flight crew's idealistic and liberal-minded purser, who is not afraid to test the rules and her Pan Am superiors. From Tacoma, Washington, Maggie worked as a waitress in a seedy diner after dropping out of college during her freshman year. She joined Pan Am by creating the impression she was fluent in Portuguese because her former employer was from Brazil.
 Margot Robbie as Laura Cameron, a stewardess newly out of training, and Kate Cameron's younger sister. Laura appears on the cover of Life magazine in her Pan Am uniform, making her a minor celebrity and a source of irritation for her older sister. Having run away from her own wedding in New Haven, Connecticut, several months prior, she struggles to grow up and prove to her sister she can stand on her own two feet. Although her face is not seen, Robbie briefly reprises the role of Laura on a Pan Am flight serving a cocktail, in Quentin Tarantino's Once Upon a Time in Hollywood, in which she also plays actress Sharon Tate.
 Michael Mosley as Ted Vanderway, the crew's first officer (co-pilot). A former United States Naval Aviator and test pilot, he was honorably discharged from the navy after a naval tribunal blamed him for the crash of an aircraft he was piloting even though his father (whose company manufactured the aircraft) admits to Ted in private that there was a mechanical problem. Though he is engaged to his childhood friend Amanda, Ted slowly develops a relationship with Laura.
 Karine Vanasse as Colette Valois, a French Pan Am stewardess. Orphaned during the German occupation of France during World War II, she still harbors resentment toward the German people. It is later revealed that her parents were French Jews who had been killed at Dachau shortly after she was left at an orphanage. Furthermore, she has a brother who was placed for adoption; by the end of the series, Colette plans to search for him.
 Mike Vogel as Dean Lowrey, a Boeing 707 pilot recently promoted to captain on Pan Am's international routes and one of the youngest airline captains in the industry. A former Air Force pilot, he had been romantically involved with the crew's former purser, Bridget, and is now pursuing a relationship with Colette. Dean also finds himself in a secret relationship with Ginny, the mistress of a Pan Am vice president.
 Kelli Garner as Catherine "Kate" Cameron, an experienced, trilingual stewardess and Laura Cameron's older, head-strong sister. During the pilot episode, Kate is recruited by the CIA and starts taking early assignments as a covert operative. She demonstrates a flair for espionage that impresses her handlers. In the final episode, she is offered a promotion from courier to agent.

Recurring 

 David Harbour as Roger Anderson, a British MI6 agent and Kate's covert intelligence operations contact in London. It is revealed in the series finale that Anderson is a double agent for the KGB.
 Jeremy Davidson as Richard Parks, Kate's CIA handler and mentor, based in New York. In the series finale, he recommends that Kate be sent to Langley for training as one of the CIA's first female field officers.
Annabelle Wallis as Bridget Pierce, an English stewardess and former Pan Am purser. She was dating Dean Lowrey before she resigned from Pan Am and vacated her flat in London following her deactivation as an MI6 courier. She recommends that Richard recruit Kate into the CIA as a courier. After Kate kills the intelligence dealer who was planning to sell a list of CIA/MI6 assets, Bridget reclaims her job at Pan Am and hopes to reclaim Dean as well.
Goran Visnjic as Niko Lonza, a Yugoslavian diplomat attached to the United Nations, serving in the United States. He becomes involved with Kate, and finds himself torn between his love of his homeland and the advantages of his new country. Visnjic appeared in a three-episode arc beginning with the series' fifth episode.
Scott Cohen as Everett Henson, a Pan Am vice president whose mistress, Ginny, has a secret affair with Dean.
 Chris Beetem as Congressman Christopher Rawlings, a Republican congressman who carries on a brief affair with Maggie, despite their political differences; Rawlings is a right-wing conservative and Maggie is a left-wing liberal.
 Darren Pettie as Captain George Broyles, a veteran Pan Am pilot who smuggles alcohol and tobacco on the side during his flights. Despite being punched in the face by Dean for this activity, he lures Maggie into becoming his business partner. He also saves Dean from termination by giving the investigating board an endorsement from Juan Trippe.
 Kal Parekh as Sanjeev, the crew's Indian flight engineer.
 Jay O. Sanders as Douglas Vanderway, Ted's father and president of a major aeronautics corporation. After Ted is discharged from the US Navy, Douglas has Juan Trippe hire him into Pan Am.
 Piter Marek as Omar, a Wahran prince who befriends Colette after boarding a flight to Rome with no money or luggage. On the rebound from her relationship with Dean, Colette accepts Omar's advances and nearly becomes engaged to him; however, he reluctantly breaks things off after Colette consents to a background check which reveals her Jewish heritage (implicitly, something Omar's family would not accept).
Veanne Cox as Miss Havemeyer, an uptight, authoritarian Pan Am supervisor who is always at odds with Maggie.
Erin Cummings as Ginny Saddler, a mistress of Pan Am vice president Everett Henson. Without his knowledge, she becomes romantically involved with Dean; however, Maggie exposes their secret affair to Henson. When Dean urges Ginny to end their affair, she takes it hard enough to smash her face through a window in Rome.
Colin Donnell as Mike Ruskin, a columnist for The Village Voice who befriends Maggie on his trip to Berlin and publishes her scathing article on Congressman Rawlings.
Ashley Greene as Amanda Mason, Ted's childhood friend and later love interest and fiancée. At a party, she unexpectedly kisses a desolate Maggie. When Ted later confronts Amanda, she admits that she feels more comfortable around women, and Ted refuses her proposal of an open marriage. In the final episode, she reveals she is pregnant.

Production 
Sony licensed the rights to use the Pan Am name and logo from Pan Am Systems, a New Hampshire–based railroad company that acquired the Pan Am brand in 1998. The pilot episode cost an estimated $10 million. The series was produced by Sony Pictures Television, and was optioned by ABC in May 2011 for the 2011–2012 schedule. ABC commissioned five more scripts in November 2011. The broadcaster later added a fourteenth episode to the series. In the middle of the season, Steven Maeda was hired as Pan Ams new showrunner, with the mandate to "serialize and embrace the soap aspect" of the show.

In November 2011, there was media speculation that the series had been canceled by ABC, based on a comment from Karine Vanasse about the future of Pan Am and its absence from the mid-season schedule. The network denied the rumors; it planned to complete fourteen episodes and delay any announcement regarding a second season to a later date. The series was canceled on May 11, 2012. Although its episodes depict the characters in various cities around the world, the show was filmed at the Brooklyn Navy Yard and other locations around New York City. The pilot was filmed partly at Gold Coast Studios in Bethpage on Long Island. According to Entertainment Weekly magazine, a life-size recreation of a Pan Am 707 jet is "the biggest star of the series—in all senses." The 707 model is kept in a hangar near the Brooklyn waterfront.

Nancy Hult Ganis, a Pan Am stewardess from 1968 to 1976, was one of the show's executive producers and is credited as the series developer; she conducted research for the series at the Pan Am Historical Foundation and at Pan Am's archives at the University of Miami. In addition, Ganis advised the actors, props department, production designers, and costumers in making details for the show as accurate as possible. The program featured the trademark, sky-blue Pan Am uniforms worn by stewardesses. Costume design was overseen by Anne Crabtree, who ensured attention to detail. The department made the replicas based on an old uniform which was thoroughly studied. Twenty craftsmen worked to produce each outfit. The technique was the same used by Pan Am in the sixties, and Crabtree remarked that the process was very "old school." At the time, girdles were mandatory to improve posture; some of the cast members found them "extremely restricting" during filming. Crabtree said that male costumes were inspired by James Dean and Steve McQueen.

Promotion 
The September 12, 2011, edition of TV Guides Fall Preview issue included an advertisement on the back of the magazine, shown upside-down, featuring Ricci, Garner, Vanasse, and Robbie appearing as their characters for a fictional cover of TV Guide, using the magazine's 1960s logo. Between December 20, 2011, and January 5, 2012, the first nine episodes of the series were made available free of charge on Internet download sites in an effort to increase viewer interest in the series. Canadian Karine Vanasse responded to a question on her Twitter account by saying that the promotion was only available in the United States.

Episodes

Broadcast 

The series aired in Canada on CTV on the same night as the ABC broadcasts, but was shown in different time slots by region. It also aired on CTV's sister cable channel Bravo! on Saturdays. The series premiered in Brazil and Panama on Sony Entertainment Television on March 18, 2012. In Costa Rica the channel Teletica aired Pan Am on October 15, 2012.

In Ireland, the show premiered on RTÉ Two on October 17. The series premiered in the United Kingdom on BBC Two on November 16, 2011. The BBC suspended its broadcast after eight episodes and stated that further episodes would return on January 28, 2012. Canal+ began broadcasting the series in Spain on October 29, 2011. The series premiered in Sweden on TV3 on October 16, 2011. On November 6, 2011, the series premiered on SIC in Portugal. On December 26, 2011, the series premiered in the Netherlands on NET 5. In Australia the series was broadcast on the Nine Network in 2012. In the Flemish part of Belgium, the airing started on Vijf on February 15, 2012., In the French part of Belgium the airing started on BeTV on May 7, 2012.   In Finland the show premiered in January 2012 on Yle TV2. In Denmark, Pan Am was aired on TV3 (Danmark), TV3 Puls & TV3+ (Denmark).  In Catalonia, TV3 started broadcasting the series on February 10, 2013.

In South East Asia, the channel beTV (a Sony Pictures Entertainment Networks Asia, SPENA television) airs the TV Show from February 4, 2012, every Saturday at 9:00 p.m. It started airing on STAR World India from February 11, 2012. In New Zealand the show premiered on November 24, 2012 with TVNZ, which rescheduled episode "Romance Languages" into chronological order to maintain series flow. It was shown every Saturday at 9:35pm on their TV One channel before being moved to a later time slot after episode 9 due to lower than expected viewing numbers.

Reception

Critical and industry reception 
The show was given a 67 out of 100 on Metacritic based on 28 reviews, indicating generally favorable reception. Heather Hogan of AfterEllen rated the show highly, saying, "I continue to be impressed by the unapologetic way Pan Am pushes the women to the forefront of every story ... I don't think Pan Am really knows what kind of show it wants to be just yet. But I also don't think that's a problem because every variation—Cold War drama, nostalgic soap opera, feminist —has something to offer." Later episodes, however, received lower reviews for the loss of focus on the women and the addition of romantic storylines. Matthew Gilbert of The Boston Globe gave the show a "B" grade, commenting, "Next to The Playboy Club it's the better network 1960s drama. The romance and the attractively stylized innocence of the era is addictive, but the espionage plot, with its link to political history, is absurd. And the female empowerment message grows feeble." The Insider included Pan Am in its list of "10 Best New Fall TV Shows."

Media coverage has noted that no major characters smoke, although the practice was common on flights and in the terminal during the 1960s. ABC and its parent Disney banned tobacco use by the show's stars. Citing "an enormous impressionable element," Thomas Schlamme called the anachronism "the one revisionist cheat," and said he had encountered a similar restriction directing a previous show for ABC. Other characters can be seen holding cigarettes in the background.

In the UK, Melissa Whitworth of The Daily Telegraph said that Pan Am chose to "airbrush" the sixties because it depicts a "romanticised" view of the period. Colin Kennedy and Sharon Lougher of the Metro said the series is "irritatingly in love with its own sense of style," though they said the storylines made it a "soapy guilty pleasure" and included it in their "pick of the day" television feature. Euan Ferguson from The Guardian praised Ricci's casting as a positive indicator of the quality of acting, but criticized the overall casting, saying similar looks and identical uniforms make it difficult for viewers to learn the characters. Emma Brockes from the Guardian said that Pan Am is "bubble gum bright" and praised the whole cast for putting in "strong performances." In Ireland, Pat Stacey of the Evening Herald said the series portrays "silly storylines" and "cheesy dialogue," calling it "mile-high mediocrity."

Scott McCartney of The Wall Street Journal noted that the show highlights the "elegance and excitement" of air travel during the early 1960s. He said that former employees of the airline thought the series is an accurate portrayal, aside from some "Hollywood glamorization."

The Association of Flight Attendants (CWA, the world's largest flight attendants' union) released a statement following the premiere of Pan Am. It said that the show is a reminder of the progress of flight attendants in relation to previous social injustices:

About the show's demise, Christina Ricci said, "I think it should not have been on network television. I think if that had been [on] a cable show or streaming, they would’ve been able to do so much more. Making a show about that period of time and having to be so PC, it doesn’t make sense, because there’s no substance there." But she is still very proud of the show, saying, "It was beautiful. It was really well made."

Viewership 
The series premiere attracted 11.06 million viewers, but viewership declined thereafter.  The second episode attracted 7.76 million, and by the sixth episode, ratings were less than half of the show's premiere. By the season's 12th episode, audiences had fallen to 3.74 million.

Following ABC's announcement of its mid-season schedule in November 2011, TV by the Numbers called Pan Am "defacto canceled" given its ratings and the fact that ABC had ordered only one further episode. A tweet by cast member Karine Vanasse ("Well, we received THE call, #PanAm is only coming back for one more episode after Christmas. But up to the end, we'll give it our all!") appeared to confirm the cancellation, though weeks later Vanasse told The Hollywood Reporter, "What I was saying is that we would come back to shoot one more episode after Christmas." In a Los Angeles Times interview published just before the series finale, showrunner Steven Maeda said that Pan Am has a "good upscale core of viewers" both live and DVR; the series finale "tie[s] up some loose ends but ... also add[s] some new threads in there to explore later. But, should [the show] not get picked up, it's a sendoff to the show viewers will be happy with."

Awards and accolades 
In 2012, the show's cinematographer John Lindley earned a nomination for Outstanding Achievement in Cinematography in One-Hour Episodic/Pilot Television by the American Society of Cinematographers. Pan Am's pilot episode was nominated for Best One-Hour Single Camera Television Series at the ADG Excellence in Production Design Awards. The series received recognition from gay critics with a Dorian Award nomination for Unsung TV Show of the Year. In May 2012, Pan Am won the Golden Rose Award for Best Series at the international Rose d'Or TV awards, beating Martina Cole's The Runaway and The Jury.

Home media 
The complete-series DVD was released on January 29, 2013 through Sony Pictures Home Entertainment. Mill Creek Entertainment re-released that format on August 13, 2019. The set was also made available in the United Kingdom on March 4, 2013, in Germany on June 20, 2013, and in Australia on January 3, 2018.

See also 
Come Fly with Me

References

External links 
 
 

TV series
2010s American workplace drama television series
2011 American television series debuts
2012 American television series endings
American Broadcasting Company original programming
Aviation television series
English-language television shows
Television series set in 1963
Television series set in 1964
Television series by Sony Pictures Television
Television shows set in New York City
Television series about flight attendants
Jet Age